St. Paul is a city in St. Charles County, Missouri, United States. The population was 1,829 at the 2010 census.

History
A post office called Saint Paul was established in 1875, and remained in operation until 1964. The community takes its name from a local Roman Catholic church of the same name.

Geography
St. Paul is located at  (38.849951, -90.736773).

Demographics

2010 census
As of the census of 2010, there were 1,829 people, 638 households, and 553 families living in the city. The racial makeup of the city was 98.7% White, 0.3% African American, 0.2% Native American, 0.1% Asian, 0.3% from other races, and 0.3% from two or more races. Hispanic or Latino of any race were 0.4% of the population.

There were 638 households, of which 34.5% had children under the age of 18 living with them, 81.2% were married couples living together, 3.0% had a female householder with no husband present, 2.5% had a male householder with no wife present, and 13.3% were non-families. 10.8% of all households were made up of individuals, and 5% had someone living alone who was 65 years of age or older. The average household size was 2.87 and the average family size was 3.10.

The median age in the city was 45.6 years. 22.6% of residents were under the age of 18; 9.2% were between the ages of 18 and 24; 16.8% were from 25 to 44; 38.7% were from 45 to 64; and 12.7% were 65 years of age or older. The gender makeup of the city was 51.1% male and 48.9% female.

2000 census
As of the census of 2000, there were 1,634 people, 506 households, and 447 families living in the city. The racial makeup of the city was 98.96% White, 0.06% African American, 0.12% Native American, 0.18% from other races, and 0.67% from two or more races. Hispanic or Latino of any race were 1.29% of the population.

There were 506 households, out of which 49.6% had children under the age of 18 living with them, 82.8% were married couples living together, 3.6% had a female householder with no husband present, and 11.5% were non-families. 8.9% of all households were made up of individuals, and 4.9% had someone living alone who was 65 years of age or older. The average household size was 3.23 and the average family size was 3.45.

In the city the population was spread out, with 32.4% under the age of 18, 7.2% from 18 to 24, 28.9% from 25 to 44, 23.6% from 45 to 64, and 7.9% who were 65 years of age or older. The median age was 37 years. For every 100 females there were 101.0 males. For every 100 females age 18 and over, there were 95.7 males.

The median income for a household in the city was $67,841, and the median income for a family was $68,438. Males had a median income of $50,000 versus $27,768 for females. The per capita income for the city was $22,216. About 1.1% of families and 1.3% of the population were below the poverty line, including 0.5% of those under age 18 and 5.3% of those age 65 or over.

References

External links
City of Saint Paul Missouri

Cities in St. Charles County, Missouri
Cities in Missouri